Kurt Vogel may refer to:

 Kurt Vogel (historian) (1888-1985), German historian of mathematics and science
 Kurt Vogel (German officer) (1889-1967), German military officer